was a Japanese photographer. He is particularly well known for his unidealized nudes of "ordinary" Japanese women executed in both pictorialist and modernist styles.

Nojima began studying at Keio University in 1906, and began taking photographs two years later. From 1915 to 1920 he ran a gallery, the Misaka Photo Shop, where he had his first solo exhibition in 1920. Around that same time he opened the Kabutoya Gado gallery, which was connected to the shirakaba-ha literary movement. Nojima later operated several other studios, such as the Nonomiya Photography Studio, and Nojima Tei, which was a salon based in his house.

He became a member of the Japan Photographic Society in 1928.

In 1984 Nojima was posthumously inducted into the International Photography Hall of Fame and Museum.

References

External links
 

Japanese photographers
1889 births
1964 deaths